James Bradford Brown (born June 7, 1950) is an American film director, primarily known for his work in documentary film. He has won four Emmys, most recently for Pete Seeger: The Power of Song. He has directed and produced four feature documentaries that received theatrical distribution. He heads Jim Brown Productions, LLC and Ginger Group Productions, Inc., production companies specializing in cultural and social documentaries and music concerts.

He studied film at Tisch School of the Arts, and is an associate professor at New York University's Kanbar Institute of Film and Television at Tisch School of the Arts.

Brown has also produced and directed works for film and television, most notably Peter Seeger: The Power of Song;  50 Years with Peter, Paul and Mary;  Free to Rock;  Billy Joel- A Matter of Trust- A Bridge to Russia- A Documentary Film; Alice's Restaurant 50th Anniversary Concert; Peter, Paul and Mary: Carry it On- A Musical Legacy; Don McLean: An American Troubadour; Legends of Folk: The Village Scene; American Roots Music, a four-part series that aired on PBS; Songs of the Civil War (documentary), a PBS special co-produced by Ken Burns; In the Hank Williams Tradition, a musical tribute co-produced by the Country Music Hall of Fame and Museum; and A Vision Shared: A Tribute to Woody Guthrie & Leadbelly (documentary), a Showtime and PBS special. He has also directed and produced shows for the Travel Channel and Sesame Street.

List of work

Television
Free to Rock (2015)
Alice's Restaurant 50th Anniversary Concert (2015)
50 Years with Peter, Paul and Mary (2014)
 Billy Joel- A Matter of Trust- A Bridge to Russia- A Documentary Film (2013)
 Woody Guthrie at 100! Live from the Kennedy Center (2013)
 Don McLean: An American Troubadour (2012)
 Legends of Folk: The Village Scene (2011)
Luxury Yachts (Travel Channel) (2007)
American Roots Music: Chicago (2006)
Great American Lake Homes (Travel Channel) (2005)
Great American Ranches (Travel Channel) (2005)
Outrageous Beach Homes (Travel Channel) (2005)
Fantastic Houseboats (Travel Channel) (2004)
Super Yachts (Travel Channel) (2004)
Outrageous Trucks (Travel Channel) (2004)
Luxurious Log Homes (Travel Channel) (2004)
Peter, Paul and Mary: Carry It On – A Musical Legacy (2004)
The Three Pickers (2003)
American Roots Music: A Portrait of Ann and Marc Savoy (2004)
American Roots Music (2001)
An Evening with Harry Belafonte and Friends (1998)
In The Spotlight: Mary Chapin Carpenter at Wolf Trap (1995)
Child of Mine (1994)
Sesame Street: Big Bird Postcards (1993)
Songs of the Civil War (1991)
Pete Seeger's Family Concert (1991)
We Shall Overcome (documentary) (1990)
Sesame Street: Cuban American Segments (1990)
A Vision Shared: A Tribute to Woody Guthrie & Leadbelly (documentary) (1988)
Sesame Street: The Navajo Segments (1989)
In the Hank Williams Tradition (1989)
We Shall Overcome (documentary) (1988)
Woody Guthrie: Hard Travelin''' (1984)

Feature filmsHolly Near: Singing For Our Lives (2018)Pete Seeger: The Power of Song (2007)Isn't This a Time! (2006)A Musical Passage (1984)The Weavers: Wasn't That a Time! (1981)

Emmy Awards
 Pete Seeger: The Power of Song in 2008 for outstanding non-fiction series
 Sesame Street: The Navajo Segments in 1991 for best children's series
 We Shall Overcome (documentary) in 1989 for documentary
 The Weavers: Wasn't That a Time!'' in 1984 for directing

References

External links

1950 births
Living people
American documentary film directors
Tisch School of the Arts alumni
Tisch School of the Arts faculty